Apache Gold (later retitled to Winnetou – 1. Teil), also known as Winnetou the Warrior, is a 1963 Western film directed by Harald Reinl. It is based on the story of Winnetou, a fictional Native-American Apache hero from the Winnetou series of German novels. It was a major commercial success, selling about  tickets at the worldwide box office.

It was shot at the Spandau Studios in Berlin and on location in Bosnia and Herzegovina. The film's sets were designed by the art director Vladimir Tadej.

Plot
Santer (Mario Adorf) and his gang are after the Apache Gold. They intrude Apache land and intercept a courier named Black Eagle. The young warrior is killed while the gangsters attempt to retrieve information from him.

Meanwhile the young chartered surveyor Charlie aka „Old Shatterhand“ (Lex Barker) discovers that the „Great Western Railway“ commits a breach of valid contracts by taking a shortcut through  Apache land. He is told that certain geological complications would leave the company no other choice but he can refute these allegations as a pretext to save money even at the costs of lives.

Winnetou (Pierre Brice) observes how the railway is built right into the land of his tribe. On his way back to his village he  comes across the corpse of Black Eagle. He brings Black Eagle to his family and reports to his father  Intschu-tschuna.

Chief Intshu-tshuna is deeply worried that even more villains like Santer will get to the Apache land and consequently kill his people if the „Great Western Railway“ can carry on.

A missionary called „Klekih-petra“ beseeches him not to start a war. He talks the aristocratic chief and his son Winnetou into setting up a meeting with a deputation of the Great Western Railway. Proceedings are prepared and Old Shatterhand is chosen to convince the Indians that the company will respect the contracts after all.

But Santer doesn't let go of his ambitions. He strives to give Winnetou's people a bad name, so that the U.S.Army will come and drive the people off their land, hereby making way for his personal ambitions.

Santer persuades the chief of a  Kiowa tribe to attack the meeting. Klekih-petra is hereby killed and Winnetou is captured by his arch enemies who plan to torture him.

Old Shatterhand risks his life in order to save Winnetou. At night he sneaks into the Kiowa's camp and cuts the chief's son's fetters.  Winnetou can escape but doesn't see his saviour.

Now Old Shatterhand and his supporters commence a crusade against Santer and his henchmen. They go to Santers strongpoint, a town called Roswell. There a tremendous fight takes place. But Winnetou also has unfinished business with Santer and goes there too. As an outsider he cannot tell the good men from the bad ones. He and his warriors attack the whole town.

Old Shatterhand gets wounded and is captured. Winnetou has him brought to the Apache village. Thanks to the dedication of Intschu-tschuna's daughter Nsho-tshi (Marie Versini) he survives. But once he has recovered he must stand trial. He claims an ordeal by battle. Chief Intshu-tshuna himself takes him on and Old Shatterhand can scarcely win.

After Old Shatterhand has spared the chief and Nsho-tshi has discovered proof that Shatterhand did free her brother, Shatterhand and Winnetou become officially friends.

Although this tribe is at the brink of civilisation and the leading family does already build houses,  Nsho-tshi wants to attend a school in St. Louis before she marries Old Shatterhand. In order to cover the looming expenses her family goes to their source of gold. But Santer is still alive and hasn't ceased to pursue his evil plans. He follows and ambushes them.  Winnetou's father dies during the fight and Nsho-tshi dies only little later in the arms of Old Shatterhand.

Cast

Awards
Goldene Leinwand ("Golden Screen")
Bambi

Background
The English version is shorter than the original German one. Many of Ralf Wolter's scenes, in which he acts in the manner of Benny Hill, are shorter. Moreover Chris Howland's appearances as a preposterous self-declared scholar have been dropped completely.

Box office
It was the highest-grossing film of 1963 in West Germany, selling  tickets and grossing . In Poland, it sold about  tickets, breaking the all-time record for the highest-grossing foreign film in Poland. It was later released in the Soviet Union, where it sold 56 million tickets in 1975, becoming the third highest-grossing foreign film of the year and the 12th highest-grossing foreign film ever in the Soviet Union. In total, the film sold about  tickets at the worldwide box office.

United States
Released on a limited basis in the United States by Columbia Pictures, the film was aired on television in several cities.

See also
Broken Arrow (1950 film)
White Feather (1955 film)
Last of the Renegades
List of highest-grossing non-English films

References

External links

Apache Gold (as Winnetou I) at Rialto Film
In-depth review by Timothy Young

1963 films
1963 Western (genre) films
Winnetou films
Films directed by Harald Reinl
1960s German-language films
German Western (genre) films
1960s Italian-language films
Italian Western (genre) films
Spaghetti Western films
West German films
Films shot in Croatia
Films shot in Yugoslavia
Films produced by Horst Wendlandt
1960s buddy films
Columbia Pictures films
Constantin Film films
Films set in the 19th century
Films set in New Mexico
1960s historical films
German historical films
Italian historical films
Yugoslav historical films
Films shot at Spandau Studios
1960s Italian films
1960s German films
Foreign films set in the United States
Yugoslav Western (genre) films